These 153 species belong to Rhithrogena, a genus of flatheaded mayflies in the family Heptageniidae.

Rhithrogena species

 Rhithrogena adrianae Belfiore, 1983 c g
 Rhithrogena allobrogica Sowa & Degrange, 1987 c g
 Rhithrogena alpestris Eaton, 1885 c g
 Rhithrogena amica Traver, 1935 i c g
 Rhithrogena ampla Kang & Yang, 1994 c g
 Rhithrogena amseli (Demoulin, 1964) c g
 Rhithrogena anatolica Kazanci, 1985 c g
 Rhithrogena anomala McDunnough, 1928 i c g
 Rhithrogena austriaca Sowa & Weichselbaumer, 1988 c g
 Rhithrogena ayadi Dakki & Thomas, 1986 c g
 Rhithrogena bajkovae Sowa, 1973 c g
 Rhithrogena basiri Ali, 1971 c g
 Rhithrogena beskidensis Alba-Tercedor & Sowa, 1987 c g
 Rhithrogena binervis Kluge, 1987 c g
 Rhithrogena bogoescui Sowa & Degrange, 1987 c g
 Rhithrogena braaschi Jacob, 1974 c g
 Rhithrogena brodskyi Kustareva, 1976 c g
 Rhithrogena brunneotincta McDunnough, 1933 i c g b
 Rhithrogena bulgarica Braasch, Soldán & Sowa, 1985 c g
 Rhithrogena buresi Sowa, 1973 c g
 Rhithrogena carpatoalpina Klonowska, Olechowska, Sartori & Weichselbaumer, 1987 c g
 Rhithrogena castellana Navás, 1927 c g
 Rhithrogena catalaunica Navas, 1916 g
 Rhithrogena caucasica Braasch, 1979 c g
 Rhithrogena cincta Navás, 1921 c g
 Rhithrogena circumtatrica Sowa & Soldán, 1986 c g
 Rhithrogena colmarsensis Sowa, 1984 c g
 Rhithrogena corcontica Sowa & Soldán, 1986 c g
 Rhithrogena dagestanica Braasch, 1979 c g
 Rhithrogena daterrai Sowa, 1984 c g
 Rhithrogena decolorata Sinitshenkova, 1973 c g
 Rhithrogena decora Day, 1954 i c g
 Rhithrogena degrangei Sowa, 1969 c g
 Rhithrogena delphinensis Sowa & Degrange, 1987 c g
 Rhithrogena diaphana Navás, 1917 c g
 Rhithrogena diensis Sowa & Degrange, 1987 c g
 Rhithrogena dorieri Sowa, 1971 c g
 Rhithrogena eatoni Esben-Petersen, 1912 c g
 Rhithrogena endenensis Metzler, Tomka & Zurwerra, 1985 c g
 Rhithrogena eugeniae Kluge, 1983 c g
 Rhithrogena excisa Sinitshenkova, 1979 c g
 Rhithrogena exilis Traver, 1933 i c g
 Rhithrogena expectata Braasch, 1979 c g
 Rhithrogena fasciata Traver, 1933 i c g
 Rhithrogena ferruginea Navás, 1905 c g
 Rhithrogena fiorii Grandi, 1953 c g
 Rhithrogena flavianula (McDunnough, 1924) i c g b
 Rhithrogena fonticola Sowa & Degrange, 1987 c g
 Rhithrogena fuscifrons Traver, 1933 i c g
 Rhithrogena futilis McDunnough, 1934 i c g
 Rhithrogena gaspeensis McDunnough, 1933 i c g
 Rhithrogena germanica Eaton, 1885 c g
 Rhithrogena giudicelliorum Thomas & Bouzidi, 1986 c g
 Rhithrogena goeldlini Sartori & Sowa, 1988 c g
 Rhithrogena gorganica Klapálek, 1907 c g
 Rhithrogena gorrizi Navás, 1913 c g
 Rhithrogena gratianopolitana Sowa, Degrange & Sartori, 1986 c g
 Rhithrogena grischuna Sartori & Oswald, 1988 c g
 Rhithrogena hageni Eaton, 1885 i c g
 Rhithrogena henschi Klapálek, 1906 c g
 Rhithrogena hercegovina Tanasijevic, 1984 c g
 Rhithrogena hercynia Landa, 1970 c g
 Rhithrogena hybrida Eaton, 1885 c g
 Rhithrogena impersonata (McDunnough, 1925) i c g b
 Rhithrogena ingalik Randolph and McCafferty, 2005 i c g
 Rhithrogena insularis Esben-Petersen, 1913 c g
 Rhithrogena iranica Braasch, 1983 c g
 Rhithrogena iridina (Kolenati, 1859) c g
 Rhithrogena jacobi Braasch & Soldán, 1988 c g
 Rhithrogena jahorinensis Tanasijevic, 1985 c g
 Rhithrogena japonica Uéno, 1928 c g
 Rhithrogena jejuna Eaton, 1885 i c g
 Rhithrogena johanni Belfiore, 1990 c g
 Rhithrogena joostiana Sowa, 1976 c g
 Rhithrogena kashmiriensis (Braasch & Soldán, 1982) c g
 Rhithrogena kimminsi Thomas, 1970 c g
 Rhithrogena klausnitzeriana Braasch, 1979 c g
 Rhithrogena klugei Tiunova, 2010 c g
 Rhithrogena laciniosa Sinitshenkova, 1979 c g
 Rhithrogena landai Sowa & Soldán, 1984 c g
 Rhithrogena lepnevae Brodsky, 1930 c g
 Rhithrogena lisettae Bauernfeind, 2003 c g
 Rhithrogena loyolaea Navás, 1922 c g
 Rhithrogena lucida Braasch, 1979 c g
 Rhithrogena manifesta Eaton, 1885 i c g
 Rhithrogena marcosi Alba-Tercedor & Sowa, 1987 c g
 Rhithrogena mariae Vitte, 1991 c g
 Rhithrogena mariaedominicae Sowa & Degrange, 1987 c g
 Rhithrogena marinkovici Tanasijevic, 1985 c g
 Rhithrogena minazuki Imanishi, 1936 c g
 Rhithrogena minima Sinitshenkova, 1973 c g
 Rhithrogena monserrati Alba-Tercedor & Sowa, 1986 c g
 Rhithrogena morrisoni (Banks, 1924) i c g
 Rhithrogena nepalensis Braasch, 1984 c g
 Rhithrogena neretvana Tanasijevic, 1984 c g
 Rhithrogena nivata (Eaton, 1871) c g
 Rhithrogena notialis Allen and Cohen, 1977 i c g
 Rhithrogena nuragica Belfiore, 1987 c g
 Rhithrogena orientalis You, 1990 c g
 Rhithrogena ornata (Ulmer, 1939) c g
 Rhithrogena oscensis Navás, 1927 c g
 Rhithrogena ourika Thomas & Mohati, 1985 c g
 Rhithrogena parva (Ulmer, 1912) c g
 Rhithrogena paulinae Sartori & Sowa, 1992 c g
 Rhithrogena picteti Sowa, 1971 c g
 Rhithrogena piechockii Braasch, 1977 c g
 Rhithrogena plana Allen and Chao, 1978 i c g
 Rhithrogena podhalensis Sowa & Soldán, 1986 c g
 Rhithrogena pontica Sowa, Soldán, Kazanci & Braasch, 1986 c g
 Rhithrogena potamalis Braasch, 1979 c g
 Rhithrogena puthzi Sowa, 1984 c g
 Rhithrogena puytoraci Sowa & Degrange, 1987 c g
 Rhithrogena reatina Sowa & Belfiore, 1984 c g
 Rhithrogena robusta Dodds, 1923 i c g
 Rhithrogena rolandi Weichselbaumer, 1995 c g
 Rhithrogena rubicunda Traver, 1937 i c g
 Rhithrogena ryszardi Thomas, 1987 c g
 Rhithrogena sartorii Zrelli & Boumaiza, 2011 c g
 Rhithrogena savoiensis Alba-Tercedor & Sowa, 1987 c g
 Rhithrogena semicolorata (Curtis, 1834) c g
 Rhithrogena siamensis Braasch & Boonsoong, 2009 c g
 Rhithrogena sibillina Metzler, Tomka & Zurwerra, 1985 c g
 Rhithrogena sibirica Brodsky, 1930 c g
 Rhithrogena siciliana Braasch, 1989 c g
 Rhithrogena soteria Navás, 1917 c g
 Rhithrogena sowai Puthz, 1972 c g
 Rhithrogena stackelbergi Sinitshenkova, 1973 c g
 Rhithrogena strenua Thomas, 1982 c g
 Rhithrogena subangulata Braasch, 1984 c g
 Rhithrogena sublineata Kazanci & Braasch, 1988 c g
 Rhithrogena tateyamana Imanishi, 1936 c g
 Rhithrogena taurisca Bauernfeind, 1992 c g
 Rhithrogena teberdensis Zimmermann, 1977 c g
 Rhithrogena tetrapunctigera Matsumura, 1931 c g
 Rhithrogena theischingeri Braasch, 1981 c g
 Rhithrogena thomasi Alba-Tercedor & Sowa, 1986 c g
 Rhithrogena thracica Sowa, Soldán & Braasch, 1988 c g
 Rhithrogena tianshanica Brodsky, 1930 c g
 Rhithrogena tibialis (Ulmer, 1920) c
 Rhithrogena trispina Zhou & Zheng, 2000 c g
 Rhithrogena uhari Traver, 1933 i c g
 Rhithrogena umbrosa Braasch, 1979 c g
 Rhithrogena undulata (Banks, 1924) i c g
 Rhithrogena unica Zhou & Peters, 2004 c g
 Rhithrogena uzbekistanicus (Braasch & Soldán, 1982) c g
 Rhithrogena vaillanti Sowa & Degrange, 1987 c g
 Rhithrogena virilis McDunnough, 1934 i c g
 Rhithrogena wolosatkae Klonowska, 1987 c g
 Rhithrogena wuyiensis (Gui, Zhou & Su, 1999) c g
 Rhithrogena zelinkai Sowa & Soldán, 1984 c g
 Rhithrogena zernyi Bauernfeind, 1991 c g
 Rhithrogena zhiltzovae Sinitshenkova, 1979 c g
 Rhithrogena znojkoi (Tshernova, 1938) c g

Data sources: i = ITIS, c = Catalogue of Life, g = GBIF, b = Bugguide.net

References

Rhithrogena